CTRM may refer to

 Critical Test Results Management, medical reporting software
 Composites Technology Research Malaysia, a Malaysian company involved in the aerospace and composites industries